Monster Inc. may refer to:

 Monster Cable, an American company best known for audio and video cables
 Monster Worldwide, an American provider of employment services
 Monsters, Inc., a 2001 American computer-animated comedy film